James George Dudley (24 August 1928 – 25 April 2006) was a Scottish footballer. He was a member of West Bromwich Albion's 1954 FA Cup winning side and scored the equalising goal against Port Vale in the semi-final at Villa Park. Albion finished as league runners-up in the same season.

Dudley made 166 successive appearances between 1952 and 1956, a club record that was surpassed by Ally Robertson in 1979.

After his football career, Dudley worked at Guest Motors West Bromwich Ford dealer as a van parts salesman

Honours

with West Bromwich Albion
FA Cup winner: 1954

with Walsall
Football League Fourth Division champion: 1959–60

References

Sources

1928 births
2006 deaths
Footballers from North Lanarkshire
Scottish footballers
Scotland B international footballers
West Bromwich Albion F.C. players
Walsall F.C. players
Arcadia Shepherds F.C. players
Scottish expatriate footballers
Expatriate soccer players in South Africa
Stourbridge F.C. players
English Football League players
Association football wing halves
FA Cup Final players